Conocephalus maculatus is a species of grasshopper in the family Tettigoniidae. It is a pest of millets and maize in Northeast India. During the summer of 2008, a large swarm severely damaged millet and maize crops in Manipur and Nagaland.

References

maculatus
Insect pests of millets